Liu Yalou (April 1910 – 7 May 1965) was a general in the Chinese People's Liberation Army who served as the inaugural commander-in-chief of the PLA Air Force. During the Chinese Civil War, he was chief of staff of Lin Biao's army group, which occupied the entire Manchuria in 1948 and captured 472,000 Kuomintang troops in the Liaoshen Campaign.

Biography

Early life
Liu was born in Wuping County, Fujian, China. He joined the CPC in Jinggangshan Mountains in August 1929, and participated in the Encirclement Campaigns on the communist side. Like many late communist commanders, Liu was also a veteran of the Long March. During the Second Sino-Japanese War he became Lin Biao's chief assistant in the Red Army University in Yan'an.

During the Long March in 1934, Liu and his commander Chen Guang succeeded in forcing a way across the Wu River, securing the Chinese Red Army's passage across the river. He also led troops to capture Zunyi, Lou Shanguan. At the Dadu River banks, he ordered the Red Fourth Army to attack Luding Bridge.

Russia
Liu was sent to study in Frunze Military Academy in 1939–1941, and was commissioned as a major in the Soviet Red Army and participated in the Soviet-German War, and wrote several important essays on the Battle of Stalingrad.

In August 1945 Liu returned to China by following Soviet Marshal Aleksandr Vasilevsky's troops that invade Manchuria during Operation August Storm before joining communist Manchurian field army. In the same month, he was appointed as the Principal of the Northeast Aviation School, which would later serve as the backbone of the People's Liberation Air Force. He became Lin Biao's chief of staff of the North Eastern Armies prior to the outbreak of the Chinese Civil War.

Chinese Civil War
With the outbreak of the Manchurian Campaign in 1947, he led forces in Linjiang. In 1948, he was appointed Chief of Staff of the Northeastern Military Region and assisted Lin Biao in the Liaoshen Campaign. During the assault on Pingjin in January 1949, Liu secured a victory over a 130,000 strong Nationalist force after 29 hours of intense battle, capturing the Nationalist General Chen Changjie. In the same year, he was appointed as a field commander of the Fourth Field Army.

Creation of the People's Liberation Army Air Force 
On 25 October 1949, Liu was appointed as the chief of air force in the People's Liberation Army and by 11 November, air force command was officially formed. In enhancing the PLA's air force, he formed 7 aviation schools and established the doctrine for the air force. After the establishment of People's Republic of China in 1950, Mao Zedong prepared to support North Korea in the Korean War. Mao ordered Liu to go to Soviet Union to lobby for their aid and to train Chinese pilots based on the Soviet model, so Liu was appointed First Commander-in-Chief of the People's Liberation Army Air Force in 1949. At that time the Chinese air force only possessed 15 Mig fighter planes. By the end of his career, he would form 27 schools dedicated to air force training.

After the Founding of the PRC
Alongside with his position within the Chinese Air Force, he was appointed as the Deputy Minister for Defense in April 1949. He was also appointed various academia positions, such as being the director of the 5th School of Research within the Ministry of Defense. During his political tenure, he was a member of the Central Military Commission and was a member of the 8th Central Committee. In 1964, he was elected as the honorary chairman of the Chinese People's Airways Association.

Personal life

Life as a writer
As Liu was very competent in Russian, he has written several books of his experiences as a military leader in both Russia and China. These included his memoirs as the Chief of Staff of the Northeastern Field Army during the Manchurian Campaign in 1947–49, and books concerning Stalin and his subordinates.

Illness
Lin Biao never visited the sick before, but only exception when he learned Liu Yalou had liver cancer, Lin then visited Liu for the first time in the hospital. After one year of considerable weight loss and other symptoms of liver cancer, Liu died in Shanghai in 1965. Lin took personally charge of Liu's funeral arrangements because Liu was one of the best assistants and staff officers in his military career.

References

1910 births
1965 deaths
People's Liberation Army generals from Fujian
Commanders of the People's Liberation Army Air Force
Frunze Military Academy alumni
People from Longyan
Chinese expatriates in the Soviet Union
Chinese military personnel of World War II
Chinese military writers
People of 88th Separate Rifle Brigade
Deputy Ministers of National Defense of the People's Republic of China